Spiraeanthemum vitiense is a species of plant in the family Cunoniaceae. It is endemic to Fiji.

References

Endemic flora of Fiji
vitiense
Endangered plants
Taxonomy articles created by Polbot
Taxobox binomials not recognized by IUCN